Alexander Aronovich Vinnikov (born 6 October 1955 in Khabarovsk Krai) is a Russian politician and formerly the governor of the Jewish Autonomous Oblast.

Political history
Alexander Vinnikov was the mayor of Birobidzhan, the capital of the Jewish Autonomous Oblast. The 2004 Birobidzhan mayoral election was held during the same time as the 2004 Russian presidential election. On 14 March 2004, Alexander Vinnikov, the incumbent, faced professor Miron Fishbeyn, and Aleksandr Kurdyukov of the Birobidzhan municipal administration. Alexander Vinnikov won the election.

Jewish community
Alexander Vinnikov is Jewish.  His family arrived in the Jewish Autonomous Oblast in 1947 from Belarus. In 2004, as mayor, he participated in the opening of the new Chabad House and Birobidzhan Synagogue in Birobidzhan. As member of the local kehilla, during the December 2005 candle-lighting of a Hanukkah Menorah, Alexander Vinnikov lit the 'shamash' candle and passed it to the Chief Rabbi of the Jewish Autonomous Oblast and Chabad Lubavich representative, Mordechai Scheiner.

Governor
According to Interfax, "Lawmakers in Russia's Jewish Autonomous Region have confirmed the appointment of Alexander Vinnikov as the region's new governor. Vinnikov, who was nominated to the post by Russian President Dmitry Medvedev on February 8, was supported by 13 deputies out of a total of 16."

See also
Jews and Judaism in the Jewish Autonomous Oblast

References

1955 births
Jewish mayors of places in Russia
Living people
People from Khabarovsk Krai
Jewish Russian politicians
Governors of the Jewish Autonomous Oblast
Mayors of places in Russia
People from Birobidzhan
Jewish Autonomous Oblast politicians
Russian religious leaders
Russian people of Belarusian-Jewish descent